Peter von Biron (15 February 1724 – 13 January 1800) was the last Duke of Courland and Semigallia, from 1769 to 1795.

Life and reign
Peter was born in Jelgava as the oldest son of Ernst Johann von Biron, future Duke of Courland, and his wife Benigna von Trotha. From 1730 until 1740, he and his family lived in Moscow and St. Petersburg, where his father was a lover and favorite of Anna of Russia.

When he was 16 years old, he was forced to follow his family into their exile, first to Tobolsk Governorate in Siberia, then from 1742 until 1762 in Yaroslavl. In 1765, he married Princess Caroline of Waldeck and Pyrmont, but the union produced only one son, who was stillborn in 1766.

In 1769, he was given the Duchy of Courland and Semigallia by his father. However, he had acted as de facto duke for several years already. In 1770, he gave an oath to the Courland Knighthood. He was also elected a Fellow of the Royal Society in 1771.

In 1775, he founded the Academia Petrina in Jelgava. Hoping that the school would grow into a university, he addressed Immanuel Kant and Johann Gottfried Herder to become professors, but both refused.
 
In 1774, he married Yevdokiya Yusupova, but the marriage was unsuccessful and they divorced in 1778. In 1779, he married Dorothea von Medem, a marriage that produced 6 children. He was known to have been abusive to at least two of his wives.

He ceded the government of the duchy and then its territory to the Russian Empire in 1795, and received in return a high appanage. This helped him to buy and refurbish for his purposes a palace in Berlin's street of Unter den Linden (Palais Kurland, bought in 1782). In 1785, he bought the park and palace in Friedrichsfelde (part of today's Tierpark Berlin), which he rebuilt in luxurious beauty.

In April 1786, he purchased the Duchy of Sagan from the Bohemian Lobkovic family, then additionally used the title of Duke of Żagań. In 1795, Russia determined the further fate of Courland when, with its allies, it began the third division of Poland. Given a "nice recommendation" by Russia, Duke Peter von Biron gave up his rights to Russia. With the signing of the final document on 28 March 1795, the Duchy of Courland ceased to exist.

Five years later, after several months of illness, Peter died in Gellenau. First, he was buried in an Augustinian abbey church, but in 1847, he was reburied in a Lutheran church in Żagań.

Marriage and issue
Peter married:

Princess Caroline of Waldeck and Pyrmont (14 August 1748 – 1782) in 1765; divorced in 1772
Princess Eudoxia Borisovna Yusopova (16 May 1743 – 1780) in 1774; divorced in 1778
Countess Dorothea von Medem (a member of the old Courland nobility) in 1779. They had six children, of whom two died in infancy. The remaining four were:
 Princess Wilhelmine, Duchess of Sagan; on Peter's death, it was she who inherited the duchy of Sagan in Silesia and the Herrschaft of Náchod in Bohemia.
 Princess Pauline (19 February 1782, Mitau - 8 January 1845, Vienna); married Prince Friedrich Hermann, Prince of Hohenzollern-Hechingen; on Peter's death, she inherited the Prager Palais and the Herrschaft of Hohlstein and Nettkow, and on Wilhelmine's death she also inherited the duchy of Sagan in Silesia and the Herrschaft of Náchod in Bohemia.
 Princess Johanna Katharina (24 June 1783, Würzau - 11 April 1876, Löbichau); married Francesco Ravaschieri Fieschi Squarciafico Pinelli Pignatelli y Aymerich, Duke of Acerenza.  In 1806, she inherited the Kurland-Palais in Prague and on her mother's death inherited the Herrschaft of Löbichau in Altenburgischen. She died without posterity.
 Princess Dorothea, married Edmond de Talleyrand-Périgord, 2nd duke of Talleyrand and 1st duke of Dino in Calabria. A Polish nobleman, Alexander Batowski, was rumoured to be her biological father, but Peter acknowledged her as his own. On Peter's death she inherited the Kurland-Palais in Berlin and the Herrschaft of Deutsch Wartenberg; on her sister Pauline's death in 1845 she also inherited the Duchy of Sagan.

References

Bibliography
 Hugo Weczerka (Hg.): Handbuch der historischen Stätten Schlesien, Stuttgart 1977
 Dehio-Handbuch der Kunstdenkmäler in Polen: Schlesien, Deutscher Kunstverlag, 2005
 Věra Vlčková: Pamětihodnosti panstvί Náchod důchodnίho Jana Müllera. In: Stopami Dějin Náchodska, Nachod 1997
 Alois Jirasek: Na dvoře vévodském, Historický Obraz. Prag 1953

External links
 

|-

|-

1724 births
1800 deaths
People from Jelgava
Dukes of Courland
Dukes of Żagań
Baltic nobility
Baltic-German people
Peter
18th-century Latvian people
18th-century monarchs in Europe
Pretenders
Fellows of the Royal Society